Puteibacter is a Gram-negative, short-rod-shaped, facultatively anaerobic and non-motile genus of bacteria from the family of Prolixibacteraceae with one known species (Puteibacter caeruleilacunae). Puteibacter caeruleilacuna has been isolated from the Yongle Blue Hole.

References

Bacteroidia
Bacteria genera
Monotypic bacteria genera
Taxa described in 2020